Zaluzianskya ovata, the night scented phlox, is a species of flowering plant in the family Scrophulariaceae, native to Lesotho and South Africa (Cape Province, KwaZulu-Natal, Free State).

It is valued in cultivation for its intense fragrance, especially at night.

As it is not completely hardy it is often grown as a summer bedding plant to be discarded after flowering. It is a suitable subject for container growing, preferring a position in full sun.

It is not closely related to the true phloxes, nor to the plant known as night scented stock, Matthiola longipetala.

References 

Flora of South Africa
Flora of Lesotho
Scrophulariaceae